Colin "Col" McLean (5 August 1920 – 20 June 1999) was an Australian rules footballer who played with Melbourne in the VFL during the 1940s.

McLean was a half back flanker for Melbourne and played in three premiership sides, going back to  back in 1940 and 1941, followed by another premiership in 1948. He missed the 1942 and 1943 seasons due to the war. As he was always used in defence he kicked only one goal in his career which came in his 46th game, in Melbourne's 1945 encounter against North Melbourne at Punt Road. He represented the Victorian interstate team twice in 1948.

References

Holmesby, Russell and Main, Jim (2007). The Encyclopedia of AFL Footballers. 7th ed. Melbourne: Bas Publishing.

External links

1920 births
1999 deaths
Australian rules footballers from Victoria (Australia)
Melbourne Football Club players
Hamilton Football Club players
Melbourne Football Club Premiership players
Three-time VFL/AFL Premiership players